Angadippuram Laterite is a notified National Geo-heritage Monument
 in Angadippuram town in Malappuram district in the southern Indian state of Kerala, India. The special significance of Angadippuram to laterites is that it was here that Dr. Francis Buchanan-Hamilton, a professional surgeon, gave the first account of this rock type, in his report of 1807, as "indurated clay", ideally suited for building construction. This formation falls outside the general classification of rocks namely, the igneous, metamorphic, or sedimentary rocks but is an exclusively "sedimentary residual product". It has generally a pitted and porous appearance. The name laterite was first coined in India, by Buchanan and its etymology is traced to the Latin word "letritis" that means bricks. This exceptional formation is found above parent rock types of various composition namely, charnockite, leptynite, anorthosite and gabbro in Kerala. It is found over basalt in the states of Goa, Maharashtra and in some regions of Karnataka. In Gujarat in western India, impressive formations of laterite are found over granite, shale and sandstone..

Apart from its use as bricks in building construction, it has other substantial economic value, since it has been established that laterites are closely juxtaposed with aluminium ore (bauxite), iron ore and nickel ore mineral deposits in many parts of Kerala.

The GSI has erected a monument at Angadippuram (see picture) where the laterite formations were first identified, as one of the 26 monuments declared as National Geological Monuments, on the occasion of the "International Conference on Laterization" held in 1979.

Angadippuram is also well known as a pilgrimage centre for its famous temples, the Thirumandhamkunnu temple and the Tali temple.

Geography

Angadipuram is situated in the Malappuram district, which lies in northern Kerala, and is bounded on the north by Wayanad and Kozhikkode districts, on the northeast by Tamil Nadu, on the southeast and south by Palakkad District, on the southwest by Thrissur District, on the west by the Arabian Sea, and on the northwest by Kozhikode District (see Kerala eco zones map). The geographical distribution of laterite is not limited to Angadipuram in Malappuram district but it is also found in the midland regions and highlands of Kerala. Its occurrence extends to Aleppey, Quilon, Thiruvananthapuram, Kottayam, Trichur and Cannanore districts. Overall, in the landform of Kerala which has seven landscape ecological zones, laterites account for a major share of 50%. This land form comprises lateritic mesa, mounds, slopes and ridges. Further, as the topography changes a few kilometers from the sea to the east, there are numerous valleys called elas where patches of paddy fields, coconut and arecanut groves are seen. Incidence of laterite in other parts of India is reported in the states of Karnataka Maharashtra and Gujarat. 

Apart from India, its global occurrence in the form of vast deposits of lateritic bauxites with rich production is reported in Australia, Brazil, Guinea, Guyana, Suriname and Venezuela.

Climate

The intense southwest Monsoon rainfall in Kerala (average annual rainfall is 3,107 mm) coupled with high temperatures (mean annual temperatures range from 25 to 27.5 °C in the coastal lowlands to 20 to 22.5 °C in the eastern highlands) and lush vegetation (belongs to the Malabar Coast moist forests of a tropical moist broadleaf forest ecoregion of southwestern India) has accentuated the chemical processes over the base rocks, which has resulted in the formation of laterites. In view of these conditions, the laterization process, which results in formation of laterites, is called the "Tropical disease of rocks".

Structure

Laterite is a residual product created by the natural process of rocks weathering in the hot humid climatic conditions and interaction with water, oxygen and carbon dioxide. In simple terms, it is a soil formation linked to the parent rock material that has evolved because of various powers of nature in the same manner as other types of soils such as alluvial soil, regular soil and red soil. It is also inferred that paleoclimate dating back several million years has been a causative factor in laterite formation. The residue usually consists of enriched iron, aluminum and titanium oxides in varying proportions. The residue is pitted and porous in appearance. Buchanan, who discovered this formation in Kerala, in his report of 1807 observed: It is diffused in immense masses, without any appearance of stratification and is placed over the granite that forms the basis of Malayala. It is full of cavities and pores and contains a large quantity of iron in the form of red and yellow ochres. In the mass, while excluded from air, it is so soft, that any iron instrument readily cuts it, and it is dug up in square masses with a pick-axe, and immediately cut into the shape wanted with a trowel or a large knife. It, very soon after, becomes as hard as brick, and resists air and water much better than any bricks that I have seen in India…

They also form plateaus. These laterite plateaus are attributed to various phases of uplift of the land in terraced formations in this region. However, in Malappuram, Kozhikode and Kannur districts in the plateau region, laterites are of greater thickness. It is also noted that top layer of laterite, over the crystalline rocks, is very compact. It is also reported by GSI that in Kerala:Quartz veins, joints and fractures can be traced from the top to the bottom of the laterite profile. The laterite profile over pyroxene granulites, metaultramafites and gneisses are characterised by relict foliation that conforms to those of the subjacent rocks which indicate the in situ nature of the laterite. Porous and spongy texture is discernible in laterites, after meta-ultramafites. Downwards, the profile grades into soft laterite with remnants of gritstone and culminates into a zone of variegated clay.

Chemical composition

It has been inferred from chemical analysis of Angadipuram laterites that they are a derivative of charnockite. The results of the chemical analysis of samples of these laterites indicate the following composition.
 SiO2 - 32%, Al2O3 – 29.38%, Fe2O3 –17.38%, TiO2 – 2.05%, Na2O – 0.95%, KO – 0.27%, CaO – 0.3% and MgO – 0.2%

Spatial variations have been recorded in the chemical composition of laterites in Kerala.

Economic uses

The economic importance of laterites comes from the mining of metals, particularly nickel and aluminium. Bauxite is an aluminium-rich laterite variety, which is commercially in demand. Worldwide resources inventory indicates that laterites are a major source of nickel and account for 70% of resources. But nickel production from this source is limited to about 40% of the total world production. Pepper one of the commercially important spices of Kerala is grown in red laterites as it provides well drained conditions with good water holding capacity. It is also rich in humus and essential plant nutrients.

Access

It is an important railway station on the Shoranur – Nilambur railway line. The main road from Palghat (Palakkad) to Calicut (Kozhikode) passes through Angadipuram via Perinthalmanna.

Gallery

References

National Geological Monuments in India
Geology of India

Geography of Malappuram district
Mining in Kerala